Robbie Eagles (ロビー・イーグルス　Robī Īgurusu, born 13 February 1990) is an Australian professional wrestler, who currently works for New Japan Pro-Wrestling (NJPW), where he is a member of Chaos. Eagles is a former IWGP Junior Heavyweight Champion and was one-half of the IWGP Junior Heavyweight Tag Team Champions with his partner Tiger Mask IV. Eagles started wrestling on the Australian independent scene, for companies like Professional Wrestling Alliance, Melbourne City Wrestling and World Series Wrestling. Eagles has also gained prominence in other countries wrestling for companies such as Chikara, Progress and Pro Wrestling Guerrilla.

Professional wrestling career

Independent circuit (2008–present) 
Robbie Eagles made his professional wrestling debut in March 2008 for Australian promotion Professional Wrestling Alliance. In November 2008, Eagles defeated Rick Sterling and Troy The Boy to become the PWA A1GP champion for his first time. In February 2009, Eagles and KC Cassidy defeated Mike Valuable and Madison Eagles. In May 2009, Eagles defended his A1GP championship against his brother, Ryan, to a 30-minute time limit draw. Eagles successfully defended his title against Matt Silva. In October 2009, Eagles was defeated by William Kidd, losing the A1GP championship. In 2010, Eagles was defeated by Damian Slater. In 2018, at a PWA and Progress joint show, Eagles was defeated by Travis Banks. In 2018, Eagles lost his PWA heavyweight championship to Jonah Rock.

In 2010, Eagles made his Melbourne City Wrestling debut as part of PWA Invades MCW, where he represented PWA. In Eagles second MCW match he defeated Ryan Rollins. Eagles and Adam Brooks defeated TMDK in the quarter final round of the MCW Tag Team Title Tournament in 2012 before being eliminated by Hard Way Inc.

In 2011, Eagles made his Chikara debut taking part in the Young Lions Cup. In 2012, Eagles made his Pro Wrestling Zero1 debut as Robby Eagle. In his debut, Eagles and Marcus Bean defeated Craig Classic and Yoshikazu Yokoyama. In June, Eagle and Ikuto Hidaka defeated Bean and Classic. On 1 July Eagle, now again named Robbie Eagles and Hidaka defeated Jonathan Gresham and Classic. On 20 July Eagles, Gresham and Hikada defeated Mineo Fujita, Takuya Sugawara and Jonny Vandal.

World Series Wrestling (2017–present) 
In 2017, Eagles debuted for World Series Wrestling, losing to Zack Sabre Jr. In 2018, Eagles defeated Marty Scurll, Abyss and Jimmy Havoc in a four-way hardcore match. On 26 June 2018 Eagles and Johnny Impact defeated Slex and Austin Aries.

New Japan Pro-Wrestling (2018–present) 
Eagles made his New Japan Pro-Wrestling debut in 2018 during New Japan's Fallout Down Under tour. On day 2, Eagles and Mick Moretti were defeated by TMDK. On day 3, Eagles and Moretti were defeated by Evil and Sanada of Los Ingobernables de Japón. On day 4, Eagles and Will Ospreay were defeated by Cody. On 8 October 2018, Bad Luck Fale announced that Eagles would be Taiji Ishimori's tag partner in the 2018 Super Jr. Tag Tournament, thus aligning himself with the Bullet Club. Ishimori and Eagles finished the tournament with a result of three wins and four losses.

On 29 June 2019 at Southern Showdown, Eagles was unsuccessful in challenging Will Ospreay for the IWGP Junior Heavyweight Championship. The following night he turned on Bullet Club leader Jay White, leaving the Bullet Club and turning face in the process and joining Chaos. On 31 August at NJPW Royal Quest, Eagles teamed up with Ospreay as the "Birds Of Prey" to defeat IWGP Junior Heavyweight Tag Team Champions El Phantasmo and Taiji Ishimori in a non-title match. On the 16 September, Ospreay and Eagles unsuccessfully challenged Phantasmo and Ishimori for the championships at Destruction in Kagoshima. At Wrestle Grand Slam in Tokyo Dome on July 25, 2021, Eagles defeated El Desperado by submission to win the IWGP Junior Heavyweight Championship for the first time in his career. He would then team with Tiger Mask to defeat El Desperado and Yoshinobu Kanemaru for their IWGP Junior Heavyweight Tag Team Championship on the Road to Power Struggle. Eagles would lose his IWGP Junior Heavyweight Championship back to El Desperado at Power Struggle.

Pro Wrestling Guerrilla (2018–2019) 
Eagles made his debut for Pro Wrestling Guerrilla during All Star Weekend 14, where he and Morgan Webster were defeated by Sammy Guevara. The next night he was defeated by Joey Janela. At PWG Bask in his Glory he was defeated by Bandido. He would later enter the 2018 Battle of Los Angeles, where he defeated DJZ in the first round, but lost to Shingo Takagi in the second round. Eagles returned to PWG on 18 January 2019 for their event Hand of Doom in Los Angeles, California where he defeated Jonathan Gresham at the event.

Wrestlers trained
Jax Jordan
Kai Drake
Matty Wahlberg
Ricky South
Snapchad
Tree Hugger Luchi
Kyle Fletcher

Championships and accomplishments
Blue Mountains Pro Wrestling
BMPW Heritage Championship (1 time)
BMPW World Heritage Series (1 time)
Melbourne City Wrestling
MCW Intercommonwealth Championship (1 time)
Newcastle Pro Wrestling
Kings Of The Castle winner (1 time) – with Mat Diamond
Newy Pro Middleweight Championship (3 times)
New Japan Pro-Wrestling
IWGP Junior Heavyweight Championship (1 time)
IWGP Junior Heavyweight Tag Team Championship (1 time) - with Tiger Mask
Professional Wrestling Alliance/Pro Wrestling Australia
A1GP Championship
King Of The New School 2010 Tag Team Tournament winner (1 time) - Mat Diamond
PWA Heavyweight Championship (3 times)
PWA Tag Team Championship (1 time) – with Mat Diamond
Pro Wrestling Illustrated
Ranked No. 267 of the top 500 singles wrestlers in the PWI 500 in 2019
 World Series Wrestling
 WSW World Heavyweight Championship (1 time)

References

External links

1990 births
Expatriate professional wrestlers in Japan
Living people
Sportspeople from Sydney
Sportsmen from New South Wales
Australian male professional wrestlers
Professional wrestling trainers
Bullet Club members
Chaos (professional wrestling) members
IWGP Junior Heavyweight champions
IWGP Junior Heavyweight Tag Team Champions